Berik is a Papuan language spoken in eastern Papua. Speakers are located in four village groups on the Tor River towards the northern coast of  Indonesian-controlled Irian Jaya.

US linguist John McWhorter cited Berik as an example of a language which puts concepts "together in ways more fascinatingly different from English than most of us are aware". Illustrating this, in the phrase Kitobana  (meaning "[he] gives three large objects to a male in the sunlight"), affixes indicating time of day, object number, object size, and gender of recipient are added to the verb.

Locations
In Tor Atas District, Berik is spoken in Beu, Bora Bora, Dangken, Doronta, Kondirjan, Safrontani, Sewan, Somanente, Taminambor, Tenwer, Togonfo, and Waf villages.

Phonology

Consonants

Vowels 
Berik has the common six vowel system (/a/, /e/, /i/, /o/, and /u/ plus /ə/).

Sample
 Angtaneʻ bosna Usafe je gatas tarnap ge nuin. Tesa ga belim taban, ga jes talebowel.
 "There was once a person named Usafe who lived near the sago acreages. Whenever he finished cutting down a sago tree, he pounded it"

Notes

References

 
 
 
 

Languages of western New Guinea
Orya–Tor languages